Matthias Brehme (born 7 February 1943) is a German former gymnast. He competed at the 1968 and 1972 Summer Olympics in all artistic gymnastics events and won two bronze medals with the East German team. Individually his best achievement was shared sixth place in the vault in 1972. He won two more bronze team medals at the world championships in 1966 and 1970 and finished second in the pommel horse at the European championships in 1972.

References

1943 births
Living people
People from Markkleeberg
German male artistic gymnasts
Sportspeople from Saxony
Olympic gymnasts of East Germany
Gymnasts at the 1968 Summer Olympics
Gymnasts at the 1972 Summer Olympics
Olympic bronze medalists for East Germany
Olympic medalists in gymnastics
Medalists at the 1972 Summer Olympics
Medalists at the 1968 Summer Olympics
Medalists at the World Artistic Gymnastics Championships
Recipients of the Patriotic Order of Merit in bronze
20th-century German people
21st-century German people